John Overington (born June 5, 1946 in Laurel, Maryland) is an American politician and a Republican member of the West Virginia House of Delegates representing District 62 since January 1999. Overington served consecutively from January 1985 until January 2003 and from January 2003 until January 2013 in the District 54 and District 55 seats.

Education
Overington earned his BS in chemistry from Washington College with graduate studies in philosophy at George Washington University.

Elections
1980s and early 1990s Overington was initially elected in the 1984 Republican Primary and the November 6, 1984 General election and was re-elected in the general elections of November 8, 1988, November 6, 1990, November 3, 1992, November 8, 1994, and November 5, 1996.
1998 Overington was unopposed for the 1998 Republican Primary and won the November 3, 1998 General election against Democratic nominee Laura Rose.
2000 Overington and returning 1998 Democratic challenger Laura Rose were both challenged in their 2000 primaries, but won, setting up a rematch; Overington won the November 7, 2000 General election against Rose.
2002 Redistricted to District 55, and with incumbent Representative John Doyle redistricted to District 57, Overington was unopposed for the 2002 Republican Primary and won the November 5, 2002 General election against Mountain Party candidate Vince George.
2004 Overington was unopposed for both the 2004 Republican Primary and the November 2, 2004 General election.
2006 Overington was unopposed for both the 2006 Republican Primary and the November 7, 2006 General election.
2008 Overington was unopposed for both the May 13, 2008 Republican Primary, winning with 1,514 votes, and the November 4, 2008 General election, winning with 6,686 votes.
2010 Overington was unopposed for the May 11, 2010 Republican Primary, winning with 652 votes, and won the November 2, 2010 General election with 3,648 votes (60.6%) against Democratic nominee Donn Marshall.
2012: Redistricted to District 62, Overington was unopposed for both the May 8, 2012 Republican Primary, winning with 848 votes, and the November 6, 2012 General election, winning with 5,024 votes.
2014: Overington won re-election to the 62nd District, defeating opponent Democrat Kris Loken.
2016: Overington was once again elected to the House, defeating Democratic challenger Christy Santana by a wide margin.

References

External links
Official page at the West Virginia Legislature
Campaign site

John Overington at Ballotpedia
John Overington at the National Institute on Money in State Politics

|-

1946 births
21st-century American politicians
Columbian College of Arts and Sciences alumni
Living people
Republican Party members of the West Virginia House of Delegates
People from Laurel, Maryland
Politicians from Martinsburg, West Virginia
Washington College alumni